Chavar (also Romanized as Chavār, Chawār, and Chūār; also known as Kani Chavar (Persian: كانی چَوار) also Romanized as Kānī Chavār and Kānī Chawār) is a city in and the capital of Chavar District, in Ilam County, Ilam Province, Iran. At the 2006 census, its population was 5,574, in 1,080 families.

The city is populated by Arkavazi Kurds.

References

Populated places in Ilam County

Cities in Ilam Province

Kurdish settlements in Ilam Province